Ježenj is a small village near the town of Pazin in Istria County, Croatia. The population is 141 (census 2011).

References

Populated places in Istria County
Pazin